The Federal Reserve Bank of Kansas City Denver Branch is second largest of three branches of the Federal Reserve Bank of Kansas City.
The branch which is in Denver opened on January 14, 1918 at 17th Street before moving in 1968 to 16th Street Mall.

Current Board of Directors
The following people are on the board of directors as of 2013:

Appointed by the Federal Reserve Bank

Appointed by the Board of Governors

Money Museum
The Denver branch houses the 7,000-square-foot Money Museum.

See also

 Federal Reserve Act
 Federal Reserve System
 Federal Reserve Bank
 Federal Reserve Districts
 Federal Reserve Branches
 Federal Reserve Bank of Kansas City
 Federal Reserve Bank of Kansas City Oklahoma City Branch
 Federal Reserve Bank of Kansas City Omaha Branch
 Structure of the Federal Reserve System

External links
 Money Museum

References

Federal Reserve branches
Federal Reserve Bank of Kansas City